São Paulo–Morumbi is a metro station on Line 4-Yellow of the São Paulo Metro operated by ViaQuatro. It is localized in the crossing of Av. Professor Francisco Morato and Av. Jorge João Saad, in the district of Butantã, West Side of São Paulo, next to Morumbi Stadium.

The initial opening date was scheduled to 2012, being delayed to 2015, 2017, until it was finally opened on 27 October 2018, working in full time since 10 November 2018. Besides that, it was opened without the urban bus terminal, which was opened two months after the station, of 29 December 2018.

The construction of the station on Line 17-Gold was interrupted because of the lack of the State resources, being in phase of services rescheduling, conditioned to obtain budgetary allocation.

Toponymy
The word "Morumbi" is an indigenous term of tupi origin that can mean "green fly" (moru: fly, and mbi: green). The ethnologist Eduardo Navarro states that "Morumbi" has other meanings, as from the tupi maromby, which meaning is "river of the big fishes" (maromba: "big fish"; y: "river"), or marumbi, term of Portuguese language that means "lagoon full of taboas".

The name symbolizes the district of Morumbi, as the station is localized between the districts of Morumbi and Butantã. Since the project until mid 2006, the project name of the station was "Morumbi". Because of a political movement aiming at the votes of soccer fans, many stations had their names changed to honor soccer teams of São Paulo. Therefore, station Morumbi had its project name changed to "São Paulo-Morumbi".

Station layout

References

São Paulo Metro stations
Railway stations located underground in Brazil
Railway stations opened in 2018
2018 establishments in Brazil